The 1972 Iowa Democratic presidential caucuses were held on January 24, 1972, as the first step in determining the Democratic nominee for the 1972 election. Uncommitted barely eked out a win with 35.8% over Maine Senator Edmund Muskie's 35.5%, while South Dakota Senator George McGovern, who had been trailing in most polls, came in a surprise third with 22.6%.

Candidates 
 Shirley Chisolm, U.S. Representative from NY-12
 Hubert Humphrey, 38th Vice President of the United States
 Henry M. Jackson, U.S Senator from Washington
 Eugene McCarthy, U.S. Senator from Minnesota
 George McGovern, U.S Senator from South Dakota
 Edmund Muskie, U.S. Senator from Maine

Results

Notes

References 

Iowa Democratic
Democratic caucus
1972
Iowa Democratic caucuses